County Buildings is a municipal facility in Mullingar, County Westmeath, Ireland.

History
In the early part of the 21st century Westmeath County Council occupied an historic building off Mount Street associated with the old county gaol. It moved to more modern facilities at the new County Buildings, designed by Bucholz McEvoy, to the south of the old facilities in Mullingar in 2009. The new building won the 2009 Opus Architecture and Construction Award and received a commendation in the 2010 Royal Institute of the Architects of Ireland Awards.

References

Buildings and structures in Mullingar
Mullingar